Juan Manuel Corzo Román (born 3 October 1961) is a Colombian lawyer and politician, currently serving as Senator of Colombia since 2002. A Conservative party politician, he was first elected to Congress as Representative for the Department of North Santander in 1998. He ran and was elected Senator of Colombia in 2002, continuing to be re-elected in 2006 and 2010; he forms part of the First Commission of the Senate.

On 12 April 1999 Corzo was kidnapped along with the 39 other passengers of an Avianca Fokker flight between Bucaramanga and Cúcuta by a command of the National Liberation Army (ELN), a leftist terrorist guerrilla group, and was held captive for 17 months until his release in September 2000.

Personal life
Juan Manuel was born on 3 October 1961 in Cúcuta to Luis Corzo Ramírez, a lawyer and notary, and his wife Lucila Román. He is married to Isabel Carmenza Sanmiguel Maldonado, a former Miss North Santander, and together have two children: Silvia and Luis Javier.

See also 
List of solved missing person cases

References

External links
 Congreso Visible - Profile

1961 births
1990s missing person cases
20th-century Colombian lawyers
Colombian Conservative Party politicians
Formerly missing people
Living people
People from Cúcuta
Saint Thomas Aquinas University alumni
Kidnapped Colombian people
Members of the Chamber of Representatives of Colombia
Members of the Senate of Colombia
Presidents of the Senate of Colombia